This is the order of battle for the ground campaign in the Gulf War between U.S. and Coalition Forces and the Iraqi Armed Forces between February 24–28, 1991. The order that they are listed in are from west to east. Iraqi units that were not in the Kuwaiti Theater of Operations are excluded from this list. Some Iraqi divisions remained un-identified by Department of Defense intelligence and a number of the details of the Iraqi order of battle are in dispute among various authoritative sources.

United States Army Central/U.S. Third Army
Lieutenant General John J. Yeosock

XVIII Airborne Corps 
LTG Gary E. Luck

Division Daguet (restructured 6th Light Armoured Division (France) (6th DLB))
 Brigadier General Bernard Janvier
 6e Régiment de Commandement et de Soutien
 1er Régiment de Parachutistes d'Infanterie de Marine
 2e Régiment d'Infanterie de Marine
 6e Régiment Étranger de Génie
 Group East (Groupement Est)
 4e Régiment de Dragons (AMX-30 main battle tanks)
 3e Régiment d'Infanterie de Marine (VAB)
 3e Régiment d'Helicopteres de Combat
 2x artillery battalions from 18th Field Artillery Brigade (M198 howitzers)
 Group West (Groupement Ouest)
 1er Régiment Étranger de Cavalerie (AMX 10 RC)
 1er Régiment de Spahis (AMX 10 RC)
 2e Régiment Étranger d'Infanterie (VAB)
 11e Régiment d'Artillerie de Marine (TRF1 howitzers)
 1e Régiment d'Helicopteres de Combat
 1x artillery battalion from 18th Field Artillery Brigade (M198 howitzers)
 2nd Brigade, 82nd Airborne Division
 1st BN, 325th Infantry Regiment (Abn)
 2nd BN, 325th Infantry Regiment (Abn)
 4th BN, 325th Infantry Regiment (Abn)
 2nd BN, 319th Field Artillery Regiment (Abn) (105T)

 82nd Airborne Division
MG James H. Johnson
1st Brigade
1st BN, 504th Infantry Regiment (Abn)
2nd BN, 504th Infantry Regiment (Abn)
3rd BN, 504th Infantry Regiment (Abn)
3rd BN, 319th Field Artillery Regiment (Abn) (105T)
2nd Brigade, detached to Division Daguet
3rd Brigade
1st BN, 505th Infantry Regiment (Abn)
2nd BN, 505th Infantry Regiment (Abn)
3rd BN, 505th Infantry Regiment (Abn)
1st BN, 319th Field Artillery Regiment (Abn) (105T)

 101st Airborne Division (Air Aslt)
MG J. H. Binford Peay III
1st Brigade
1st BN, 327th Infantry Regiment (Air Aslt)
2nd BN, 327th Infantry Regiment (Air Aslt)
3rd BN, 327th Infantry Regiment (Air Aslt) – Sent to 2nd BDE on Feb 27, 91
2nd BN, 320th Field Artillery Regiment (Air Aslt) (105T)
2nd Brigade
1st BN, 502nd Infantry Regiment (Air Aslt) – With 1st BDE until Feb 27, 91
3rd BN, 502nd Infantry Regiment (Air Aslt)
1st BN, 320th Field Artillery Regiment (Air Aslt) (105T)
3rd Brigade
1st BN, 187th Infantry Regiment (Air Aslt)
2nd BN, 187th Infantry Regiment (Air Aslt)
3rd BN, 187th Infantry Regiment (Air Aslt)
3rd BN, 320th Field Artillery Regiment (Air Aslt) (105T)

 24th Infantry Division (Mech)
MG Barry McCaffrey
1st Brigade
4th BN, 64th Armor Regiment
2nd BN, 7th Infantry Regiment (Mech)
3rd BN, 7th Infantry Regiment (Mech)
1st BN, 41st Field Artillery Regiment (155SP)
2nd Brigade
1st BN, 64th Armor Regiment
3rd BN, 69th Armor Regiment
3rd BN, 15th Infantry Regiment (Mech)
3rd BN, 41st Field Artillery Regiment (155SP)
 197th Infantry Brigade (Mech) – Acting 3rd Brigade
2nd BN, 69th Armor Regiment
1st BN, 18th Infantry Regiment (Mech)
2nd BN, 18th Infantry Regiment (Mech)
4th BN, 41st Field Artillery Regiment(155SP)

Corps assets

 3rd Armored Cavalry Regiment COL Douglas Starr
1st Squadron (ACS) ("Tiger"), 3rd ACR
2nd Squadron (ACS) ("Sabre"), 3rd ACR
3rd Squadron (ACS) ("Thunder"), 3rd ACR
4th Squadron (RAS) ("Longknife"), 3rd ACR

 20th Engineer Brigade (Abn)
36th Engineer Group – Supported 24th Inf Div
5th Engineer Battalion (CBT)
20th Engineer Battalion (CBT)
92nd Engineer Battalion (CBT HVY)
299th Engineer Battalion (CBT)
265th Engineer Group GA ARNG – Supported 24th Inf Div
27th Engineer Battalion (CBT)(Abn)
37th Engineer Battalion (CBT)(Abn)
62nd Engineer Battalion (CBT HVY)
937th Engineer Group – Supported 6th Lt Armor Div
46th Engineer Battalion (CBT HVY)
52nd Engineer Battalion
844th Engineer Battalion (CBT HVY)

 18th Field Artillery Brigade (Abn) – Supported Division Daguet
3rd BN, 8th Field Artillery Regiment (155T)
5th BN, 8th Field Artillery Regiment (155T)
6th BN, 27th Field Artillery Regiment (MLRS)
1st BN, 39th Field Artillery Regiment (155T) (ABN)
1st BN, 201st Field Artillery Regiment (155SP) WV ARNG

 196th Field Artillery Brigade TN ARNG
1st BN, 181st Field Artillery Regiment (203SP) TN ARNG
1st BN, 623rd Field Artillery Regiment (203SP) KY ARNG

 212th Field Artillery Brigade – Supported 24th Inf Div
2nd BN, 17th Field Artillery Regiment (155SP)
2nd BN, 18th Field Artillery Regiment (203SP)
3rd BN, 27th Field Artillery Regiment (MLRS)

 1st Corps Support Command (Abn)
46th Corps Support Group (Abn)
101st Corps Support Group
171st Corps Support Group USAR
507th Corps Support Group

 44th Medical Brigade (Abn)
1st Medical Group
2nd Mobile Army Surgical Hospital
5th Mobile Army Surgical Hospital
10th Mobile Army Surgical Hospital
28th Combat Support Hospital
41st Combat Support Hospital
46th Combat Support Hospital
47th Combat Support Hospital
62nd Medical Group
15th Evacuation Hospital
44th Evacuation Hospital USAR
86th Evacuation Hospital
93rd Evacuation Hospital
109th Evacuation Hospital AL ARNG

 16th Military Police Brigade (Abn)
160th Military Police Battalion
503rd Military Police Battalion (ABN)
519th Military Police Battalion
759th Military Police Battalion

 35th Signal Brigade (Abn)
25th Signal Battalion
50th Signal Battalion
327th Signal Battalion
426th Signal Battalion

 525th Military Intelligence Brigade (Abn)
15th Military Intelligence Battalion
319th Military Intelligence Battalion
337th Military Intelligence Battalion
519th Military Intelligence Battalion

VII Corps
LTG Frederick M. Franks, Jr.

 1st Armored Division
MG Ronald H. Griffith
 3rd Brigade, 3rd Infantry Division (Mech) – Acting 1st Brigade
4th BN, 66th Armor Regiment
1st BN, 7th Infantry Regiment (Mech)
4th BN, 7th Infantry Regiment (Mech)
2nd BN, 41st Field Artillery Regiment (155SP)
2nd Brigade
1st BN, 35th Armor Regiment
2nd BN, 70th Armor Regiment
4th BN, 70th Armor Regiment
6th BN, 6th Infantry Regiment (Mech)
2nd BN, 1st Field Artillery Regiment (155SP)
3rd Brigade
3rd BN, 35th Armor Regiment
1st BN, 37th Armor Regiment
7th BN, 6th Infantry Regiment (Mech)
3rd BN, 1st Field Artillery Regiment (155SP)

 3rd Armored Division
MG Paul E. Funk
1st Brigade
4th BN, 32nd Armor Regiment
4th BN, 34th Armor Regiment
3rd BN, 5th Cavalry Regiment (Mech)
5th BN, 5th Cavalry Regiment (Mech)
3rd BN, 1st Field Artillery Regiment (155SP)
2nd Brigade
4th BN, 18th Infantry Regiment (Mech)
3rd BN, 8th Cavalry Regiment (Armor)
4th BN, 8th Cavalry Regiment (Armor)
4th BN, 82nd Field Artillery Regiment (155SP)
3rd Brigade
5th BN, 18th Infantry Regiment (Mech)
2nd BN, 67th Armor Regiment
4th BN, 67th Armor Regiment
2nd BN, 82nd Field Artillery Regiment (155SP)

 1st Infantry Division (Mech)
MG Thomas Rhame
1st Brigade
5th BN, 16th Infantry Regiment (Mech)
1st BN, 34th Armor Regiment
2nd BN, 34th Armor Regiment
1st Bn, 5th Field Artillery Regiment (155SP)
2nd Brigade
2nd BN, 16th Infantry Regiment (Mech)
3rd BN, 37th Armor Regiment
4th BN, 37th Armor Regiment
4th Bn, 5th Field Artillery Regiment (155SP)
 3rd Brigade, 2nd Armored Division – Acting 3rd Brigade
1st BN, 41st Infantry Regiment (Mech)
2nd BN, 66th Armor Regiment
3rd BN, 66th Armor Regiment
4th Bn, 3rd Field Artillery Regiment (155SP)

1st (UK) Armoured Division
Maj Gen Rupert Smith
 4th Armoured Brigade
Brig. Christopher Hammerbeck
14th/20th King's Hussars & squadron of Life Guards (Challenger 1)
1st Bn, Royal Scots (Warrior)
3rd Bn, Royal Regiment of Fusiliers (Warrior)
2nd Field Regiment, RA (155SP)
23 Engineer Regiment (AVRE)
 7th Armoured Brigade
Brig. Patrick Cordingley
Royal Scots Dragoon Guards & troops of 17th/21st Lancers (Challenger)
Queen's Royal Irish Hussars (Challenger)
1st Bn, Staffordshire Regiment (Warrior)
40th Field Regiment RA (155SP)
21 Engineer Regiment (AVRE)
Divisional Armoured Reconnaissance unit
16th/5th The Queen's Royal Lancers & squadron Queen's Dragoon Guards (Scimitar/Spartan/Striker)
Divisional Artillery Group
32nd Heavy Regiment RA (203SP)
39th Heavy Regiment RA (MLRS)
26th Field Regiment RA (155SP)
12th Air Defence Regiment RA (Rapier)
 
 1st Cavalry Division(-) Missing 3rd Brigade
MG John H. Tilelli, Jr.
1st Brigade
3rd BN, 32nd Armor Regiment
2nd BN, 8th Cavalry Regiment (Armor)
2nd BN, 5th Cavalry Regiment (Mech)
1st BN, 82nd Field Artillery Regiment (155SP)
2nd Brigade
1st BN, 32nd Armor Regiment
1st BN, 5th Cavalry Regiment (Mech)
1st BN, 8th Cavalry Regiment (Armor)
3rd BN, 82nd Field Artillery Regiment (155SP)

Corps assets

 2nd Armored Cavalry Regiment

7th Engineer Brigade
 109th Engineer Group SD ARNG – Supported VII Corp
9th Engineer Battalion (CBT)(MECH)
527th Engineer Battalion (CBT HVY) LA ARNG
 176th Engineer Group VA ARNG – Supported 1st Inf Div
19th Engineer Battalion (Corps CBT)
54th Engineer Battalion (CBT)(MECH)
82nd Engineer Battalion (CBT)(MECH)
92nd Engineer Battalion (CBT HVY)
565th Engineer Battalion
649th Engineer Battalion (TOPO)
 926th Engineer Group USAR – Supported 1st Arm Div
249th Engineer Battalion (CBT HVY)
317th Engineer Battalion (CBT)(MECH)
588th Engineer Battalion (CORPS CBT)

 42nd Field Artillery Brigade – Supported 1st Inf Div, 3rd Armd Div
3rd BN, 20th Field Artillery Regiment (155SP)
1st BN, 27th Field Artillery Regiment (MLRS)
2nd BN, 29th Field Artillery Regiment (155SP)

 75th Field Artillery Brigade – Supported 1st Inf Div, 1st Armd Div
1st BN, 17th Field Artillery Regiment (155SP)
5th BN, 18th Field Artillery Regiment (203SP)
1st BN, 158th Field Artillery Regiment (MLRS) OK ARNG

 142nd Field Artillery Brigade AR ARNG –  Supported 1st Inf Div, 1st UK Armd Div
1st BN, 142nd Field Artillery Regiment (203SP) AR ARNG
2nd BN, 142nd Field Artillery Regiment (203SP) AR ARNG

 210th Field Artillery Brigade – Supported 2nd ACR, 1st Inf Div
3rd BN, 17th Field Artillery Regiment (155SP)
6th BN, 41st Field Artillery Regiment (155SP)
C Btry, 4th Battalion, 27th Field Artillery (MLRS)

2nd Corps Support Command
7th Corps Support Group
6th Transportation Battalion
71st Maintenance Battalion
87th Maintenance Battalion
213th Support Battalion
16th Corps Support Group
4th Transportation Battalion
101st Ordinance Battalion 
13th Support Battalion
300th Service & Support Battalion
30th Corps Support Group NC ARNG
136th Quartermaster Battalion
690th Maintenance Battalion
43rd Corps Support Group
68th Transportation Battalion
169th Maintenance Battalion
544th Maintenance Battalion
553rd Service & Support Battalion
159th Corps Support Group USAR
286th Service & Support Battalion

 332nd Medical Brigade USAR
127th Medical Group AL ARNG
31st Combat Support Hospital
128th Combat Support Hospital
377th Combat Support Hospital USAR
403rd Combat Support Hospital USAR
341st Medical Group USAR
159th Mobile Army Surgical Hospital LA ARNG
475th Mobile Army Surgical Hospital KY ARNG
807th Mobile Army Surgical Hospital USAR
912th Mobile Army Surgical Hospital USAR
345th Combat Support Hospital USAR – Converted to a MASH in January
Task Forces Evac (Provisional)
12th Evacuation Hospital
13th Evacuation Hospital WI ARNG
148th Evacuation Hospital AR ARNG
312th Evacuation Hospital USAR
410th Evacuation Hospital USAR

 14th Military Police Brigade
93rd Military Police Battalion
95th Military Police Battalion
118th Military Police Battalion RI ARNG
372nd Military Police Battalion DC ARNG
793rd Military Police Battalion

 93rd Signal Brigade

 207th Military Intelligence Brigade
2nd Military Intelligence Battalion
307th Military Intelligence Battalion
511th Military Intelligence Battalion

Joint Forces Command North 
Egyptian II Corps
4th Armoured Division
3rd Mechanized Infantry Division

Task Forces Khalid
Forces Muthana
Saudi 20th Mechanized Brigade
Kuwaiti 35th Mechanized Brigade
Forces Saad
Saudi 45th Armored Brigade
Kuwaiti 15th Infantry Brigade

Syrian 9th Armored Division

Syrian 45th Commando Brigade

I Marine Expeditionary Force
LTG Walter E. Boomer
Headquarters and Service Company

 1st Marine Division (Reinforced)

1st Marine Regiment (TF Papa Bear)
1st BN, 1st Marine Regiment
3rd BN, 9th Marine Regiment
1st Tank Battalion
3rd Marine Regiment (TF Taro)
1st BN, 3rd Marine Regiment
2nd BN, 3rd Marine Regiment
3rd BN, 3rd Marine Regiment
4th Marine Regiment (TF Grizzly)
2nd BN, 7th Marine Regiment
3rd BN, 7th Marine Regiment
7th Marine Regiment (TF Ripper)
1st BN, 5th Marine Regiment
1st BN, 7th Marine Regiment
3rd Tank Battalion
11th Marine Regiment (TF King)
1st BN, 11th Marine Regiment (155T)
3rd BN, 11th Marine Regiment (155T)
5th BN, 11th Marine Regiment (155T/155SP/203SP)
1st BN, 12th Marine Regiment (155T)
3rd BN, 12th Marine Regiment (155T)
1st Reconnaissance Battalion
1st Light Armored Infantry Battalion(-)(Reinforced) (TF Shepherd)
1st Battalion, 25th Marines(TF Warden)

 2nd Marine Division (Reinforced)

1st Brigade, 2nd Armored Division (Army)
1st BN, 67th Armor Regiment
3rd BN, 67th Armor Regiment
2nd Tank Battalion (USMC)
3rd BN, 41st Infantry Regiment (Mech)
1st BN, 3rd Field Artillery Regiment (155SP)
6th Marine Regiment
2nd BN, 2nd Marine Regiment
1st BN, 6th Marine Regiment
3rd BN, 6th Marine Regiment
8th Tank Battalion USMCR
8th Marine Regiment 
2nd BN, 4th Marine Regiment
1st BN, 8th Marine Regiment
3rd BN, 23rd Marine Regiment
Bravo/Charlie Companies 4th Tank Battalion USMCR
10th Marine Regiment
2nd BN, 10th Marine Regiment (155T)
3rd BN, 10th Marine Regiment (155T)
5th BN, 10th Marine Regiment (155SP/203SP)
2nd BN, 12th Marine Regiment (155T)

Corps assets
1st Surveillance, Reconnaissance, and Intelligence Group
1st Radio Battalion
1st Force Service Support Group (General Support)
General Support Group 1
Combat Service Support Detachment 131
Combat Service Support Detachment 132
2nd Supply Battalion (-) (Reinforced)
2nd Maintenance Battalion (-) (Reinforced)
6th Motor Transport Battalion (-) (Reinforced)
1st Landing Support Battalion (-) (Reinforced)
1st Dental Battalion
General Support Group 2
7th Motor Transport Battalion (-) (Reinforced)
2nd Landing Support Battalion (-)
1st Medical Battalion (-)
Combat Service Support Detachment 91
2nd Force Service Support Group (Direct Support)
7th Engineer Support Battalion (-) (Reinforced)
8th Engineer Support Battalion (-) (Reinforced)
8th Motor Transport Battalion (-) (Reinforced)
2nd Medical Battalion (-) (Reinforced)
2nd Dental Battalion (-)
Direct Support Group 1
Combat Service Support Detachment 10
Mobile Combat Service Support Detachment 11
Mobile Combat Service Support Detachment 17
Direct Support Group 2
Mobile Combat Service Support Detachment 26
Mobile Combat Service Support Detachment 28
24th Marine Regiment(-)
2nd Battalion, 24th Marines
3rd Battalion, 24th Marines

Joint Forces Command East 
Gen. Khalid bin Sultan
Saudi 10th Mechanized Brigade

North Omani Brigade (reinforced)

United Arab Emirates Mechanized Battalion

Task Force "Othman"
Royal Saudi 8th Mechanized Brigade
Kuwaiti "Al Fatah" Brigade
Kuwaiti 2/5 Mechanized Battalion
Bahraini Motorized Infantry Company

Task Force "Abu Bakr"
2nd Brigade, Saudi National Guard

Task Force "Tariq"
Royal Saudi Marine Battalion
Moroccan 6th Mechanized Battalion
Senegalese 1st Infantry Battalion

Iraqi forces
Saddam Hussein

VII Corps 
25th Infantry Division
27th Infantry Division
28th Infantry Division
48th Infantry Division

Second line
12th Armored Division
26th Infantry Division
31st Infantry Division
47th Infantry Division

IV Corps 
Maj. Gen. Iyad Khalil Zaki
16th Infantry Division
20th Infantry Division
30th Infantry Division
34th Infantry Division
36th Infantry Division

Second line
1st Mechanized Division
34th Armored Brigade
1st Mechanized Brigades
27th Mechanized Brigades
6th Armored Division
21st Infantry Division

III Corps 
Maj. Gen. Salah Aboud Mahmoud
7th Infantry Division
8th Infantry Division
11th Infantry Division
14th Infantry Division
15th Infantry Division
18th Infantry Division
19th Infantry Division
29th Infantry Division

Second line
3rd Armored Division
6th and 12th Armoured Brigades
8th Mechanised Brigade
5th Mechanized Division
15th and 20th Mechanised Brigades
26th Armoured Brigade
35th Infantry Division

II Corps 
Positioned around northern Kuwait
2nd Infantry Division
37th Infantry Division
Infantry Division

Second line
51st Mechanized Division

Reserve

Republican Guard Forces Command
Lt. Gen. Ayad Futayyih Al-Rawi

1st Republican Guard Corps
 1st Armored Division "Hammurabi"
17th and 18th Armored Brigades
8th and 9th Mechanized Brigades
 2nd Armored Division "Al-Medina"
2nd and 10th Armored Brigades
14th Mechanized Brigade
3rd Mechanized Division "Tawakalna"
9th Armored Brigade
18th and 29th Mechanized Brigades
4th Motorized Division "Al-Faw"
8th Infantry Division "As Saiqa" (special forces)

2nd Republican Guard Corps
5th Mechanized Division "Baghdad"
4th, 5th and 6th Motorized Brigades
6th Mechanized Division "Nebuchadnezzar"
19th, 22nd and 23rd Motorized Brigades
7th Motorized Division "Adnan"
21st Armored Brigade
11th and 12th Motorized Brigades

IX Corps
10th Armored Division
17th Armored Division
52nd Armored Division
45th Infantry Division
49th Infantry Division
? Infantry Division

Notes

References

External links
British Ground Force in the Gulf War, 1990–91

Military units and formations of the Gulf War
Orders of battle
Gulf War
Gulf War
Gulf War